The Personal Health Investment Today (PHIT) Act - H.R.1679 and S.680 is bipartisan legislation that would allow Americans to use flexible spending accounts (FSAs) and health savings accounts (HSAs) to pay for fitness equipment, exercise videos, participation fees associated with youth sports leagues, and health club memberships.

Currently, the IRS code allows these accounts to be used for traditional medical expenses like prescription medications and doctor visits. If passed, PHIT will allow individuals to use up to $1,000 per year to cover exercise-related costs and families to use up to $2,000 per year. Consumers will be able to save 20 to 30% on fitness expenses through the use of pre-tax accounts.

PHIT supporters say the aim is to make the healthy choice the easiest choice for families and individuals. The bill amends the IRS definition of a medical expense to include exercise-based preventative expenses. Decades of research prove that leading a physically active lifestyle is integral to good health. Physical inactivity and obesity are associated with several types of cancer, diabetes, Alzheimer's, and a host of other ailments that are detrimental to our health, pocketbooks, and economy.

What the PHIT Act Would and Would Not Cover 

In its current form, the PHIT Act would create a tax incentive for qualified sports and fitness expenses.

Expenses that would be covered include 

 health club memberships 
 personal training services 
 exercise DVDs 
 exercise equipment 
 exercise competition fees (e.g., 5k entrance fee, marathon) 
 yoga and other group fitness classes 
 sports camps and clinics

Expenses that would not be covered include 

 membership fees at specific private clubs 
 footwear and apparel that can be utilized outside of sport/exercise (e.g., sneakers or yoga pants)

Cost of PHIT 
As of 2018, the Joint Committee on Taxation (JCT) estimates the cost of this bill to be $3.5 billion over the next 10 years. The federal budget for just the 2020 fiscal year was set at $4.79 trillion. Assuming similar yearly budgets over the next decade, PHIT would cost 0.007% or less than 1/100 of 1% of the federal budget over the next decade.

There is ample evidence showing that health care savings derived from Americans becoming more active would offset this cost. According to the Centers for Disease Control, $117 billion in annual health care costs are associated with inadequate physical activity.

In 2019, a bipartisan group of Congress members introduced the Preventive Health Savings Act of 2019, which would direct the Congressional Budget Office (CBO) to more accurately reflect the cost-savings of preventive healthcare, including health screenings. This would allow Congressional Committees reviewing healthcare legislation—like the PHIT Act—to request up to two additional ten-year projection windows to provide a better understanding of the legislation's long-term effect on the nation's healthcare spending.

Congress Members Who Have Introduced PHIT 
The PHIT Act was first introduced in the House on May 25, 2006.

PHIT Bill Numbers in Previous Congress Sessions

Bills PHIT Has Been Attached To 
In 2018, during the 115th Congress, PHIT was attached to H.R.6199 - Restoring Access to Medication and Modernizing Health Savings Accounts Act of 2018.

Total PHIT Sponsors Per Congressional Session

PHIT Passes the House of Representatives 
On August 8, 2018, the Personal Health Investment Today (PHIT) Act passed the House of Representatives for the first time, as part of a larger HSA bill package (H.R. 6199) by a vote of 277 to 142. However, the 115th Congress adjourned before the Senate could vote.

Since the Senate was unable to vote on PHIT before adjourning the 115th Congress, PHIT will need to pass House again in the current Congress before it can become a law.

References

Further reading
Information on PHIT at the International Health, Racquet & Sportsclub Association website.

United States proposed federal health legislation
United States proposed federal taxation legislation
Proposed legislation of the 109th United States Congress
Proposed legislation of the 110th United States Congress
Proposed legislation of the 111th United States Congress
Proposed legislation of the 112th United States Congress
Proposed legislation of the 113th United States Congress
Proposed legislation of the 114th United States Congress
Proposed legislation of the 115th United States Congress
Proposed legislation of the 116th United States Congress
Proposed legislation of the 117th United States Congress